Hakea macrorrhyncha is a shrub in the family Proteaceae native to Australia. A restricted species of north-eastern New South Wales and south-eastern Queensland.

Description
Branchlets are densely covered with short soft matted hairs and remain until flowering. Appearing white initially and densely covered with matted hairs becoming smooth without hairs. An inflorescence of 3−4 flowers appear in leaf axils. Cream-white flowers appear from August to September.

Taxonomy and naming
Hakea macrorrhyncha was first formally described in 1996 by William Barker and the description was published in  Journal of the Adelaide Botanic Garden. The specific epithet is derived from Greek macro- meaning "long"  and rhynch- meaning "nose" or "beak", referring to the long beak of the fruit.

Distribution and habitat
Hakea macrorrhyncha is a restricted to the Torrington  area of north-eastern N.S.W and nearby Girraween National Park and surrounds. Also found in south-eastern Queensland. Grows in hilly granitic locations of  open forest or low woodland.

Conservation status
Hakea macrorrhyncha is classified as rare under Queensland's Nature Conservation (Wildlife) Regulation 2006.

References

macrorrhyncha
Taxa named by William Robert Barker